Črni Potok is a dispersed settlement in the valley of Black Creek south of Šmartno pri Litiji in central Slovenia. The area is part of the historical region of Lower Carniola. The entire Municipality of Šmartno pri Litiji is now included in the Central Slovenia Statistical Region. It includes the hamlets of Brezje (formerly Sveti Križ) and Sela.

The local church, built on a small hill in the southwestern hamlet of Brezje, is dedicated to the Exaltation of the Holy Cross and belongs to the Parish of Šmartno. It dates to the 17th century.

References

External links
Črni Potok at Geopedia

Populated places in the Municipality of Šmartno pri Litiji